Harpetida is one of the eleven orders of the extinct arthropod class Trilobita. The first harpetid trilobites appear in the Upper Cambrian, and the last species die out at the end of the Devonian period.

Harpetid trilobites are characterized among trilobites by bearing a comparatively large, semicircular brim around the cephalon (head) which is often perforated by small pores. This brim is thought to serve as a filter-feeding apparatus. The brim stretches backward on either side of the cephalon (head) and typically has a pronounced suture along the outside.

The compound eyes are typically reduced to small tubercles, though they have strong ridges stretching to the glabella (central region of the cephalon). They also typically have 12 or more thoracic segments. The pygidia are usually small.

The families of Harpetida were formerly included in the order Ptychopariida, but were recently given their own order (Ebach & McNamara 2002). The subclass Librostoma was erected in 1990 by Richard Fortey to cover the various orders originally placed within Ptychopariida. The name "Harpidae" was once used as the name for the trilobite family containing the type genus Harpes. However, this is in conflict with the use of the same name for the family of harp snails and that taxon had precedence.

Families and genera

Entomaspididae
Baikadamaspis
Entomaspis (=Hypothetica)
Harpetidae
Arraphus
Bohemoharpes (=Declivoharpes; =Unguloharpes)
Bowmania
Brachyhipposiderus
Conococheaguea
Dolichoharpes
Dubhglasina (=Australoharpes; Sinoharpes)
Eoharpes (/Harpina)
Eotrinucleus
Harpes (=Helioharpes; Reticuloharpes)
Heterocaryon
Hibbertia (/Platyharpes; Harpesoides; Metaharpes; Paraharpes; Thorslundops; Wegelinia) 
Kathrynia
Kielania (=Lowtheria)
Lioharpes (=Fritchaspis)
Paleoharpes
Scotoharpes (=Aristoharpes; Selenoharpes). 
Harpididae
Chencunia
Dictyocephalites
Fissocephalus
Harpides
Harpidoides
Kitatella
Loganopeltis
Loganopeltoides
Metaharpides
Paraharpides
Pscemiaspis

External links
Order Harpetida - from A Guide to the Orders of Trilobites by Sam Gon III

 
Trilobite orders
Cambrian first appearances
Late Devonian animals
Late Devonian extinctions